Saleha Mosharraf (1 May 1949 – 28 August 2014) was a Bangladesh Awami League politician and a Jatiya Sangsad member from the Faridpur-4 constituency.

Career
Mosharraf was married to  Mosharraf Hossain, a member of parliament from Faridpur-4 and former member of the  Mukti Bahini. Following the death of her husband, by-elections were called in  his constituency. She was elected to the parliament from that constituency. She was selected to parliament in 2009 for a women's reserved seat. She served as the president of Sadarpur Upazila unit of Bangladesh Awami League.

Death
Mosharraf died on 29 August 2014 at the Faridpur Diabetic Medical College Hospital.

References

1949 births
2014 deaths
Awami League politicians
7th Jatiya Sangsad members
9th Jatiya Sangsad members
Place of birth missing
21st-century Bangladeshi women politicians
Women members of the Jatiya Sangsad